Made in England is a two-CD-set album released by the cellist Julian Lloyd Webber in 2003.

Track listing

CD 1
 Antônio Carlos Jobim: The Girl from Ipanema
 Julian Lloyd Webber: Kheira's Theme
 George Gershwin: Bess, You Is My Woman Now
 Secret Garden: Duo
 J. S. Bach: Air on the G String
 Massenet: Meditation from Thaïs
 J. S. Bach: Siciliana
 Xavier Montsalvatge: Cradle Song
 Cyril Scott: Lullaby
 Debussy: Beau Soir
 Fauré: Berceuse (Dolly Suite)
 Andrew Lloyd Webber: The Music of the Night (from The Phantom of the Opera)
 Heitor Villa-Lobos: Bachianas Brasileiras No. 4
 Debussy: Clair de lune
 Castelnuovo-Tedesco: Sea Murmurs
 Julian Lloyd Webber: Song for Baba
 Dave Heath: Gentle Dreams
 Andrew Lloyd Webber: Pie Jesu
 Max Bruch: Kol Nidrei

CD 2
 Elton John: Your Song (with piano by Elton John)
 Vladimir Vavilov, ascribed to Caccini: Ave Maria
 Traditional (arr Grainger): Brigg Fair
 Evert Taube: Nocturne
 Dvořák: Songs My Mother Taught Me
 Elgar: Chanson de Matin
 Franck: Panis Angelicus
 Fauré: Elegie
 Elgar: First movement (cello concerto)
 Julian Lloyd Webber: Jackie's Song
 Bach/Gounod: Ave Maria
 Hewitt: Shepherd's Lullaby
 Vangelis: Un Apres Midi
 J. S. Bach: Adagio in G
 Saint-Saëns: Le cygne (from The Carnival of the Animals)
 Albinoni: Adagio
 J. S. Bach: Jesu, Joy of Man's Desiring
 Andrew Lloyd Webber: Theme and Variations 1–4
 Rimsky-Korsakov: The Flight of the Bumblebee

References

Julian Lloyd Webber albums
2003 albums